6063 Jason is an Apollo asteroid discovered on 27 May 1984, by Carolyn and Eugene Shoemaker at Palomar. Its highly eccentric orbit crosses the orbits of Mars, Earth, and Venus. From 1800 to 2200 it approached a planet within 30 Gm 69 times: Mercury 11, Venus 27, Earth 18, and Mars 13 times.

References

External links 
  calculations by SOLEX
 
 
 

006063
Discoveries by Eugene Merle Shoemaker
Discoveries by Carolyn S. Shoemaker
Named minor planets
19840527